Dana Allen Brown (born February 19, 1967) is an American baseball executive. He is the general manager of the Houston Astros of Major League Baseball.

Brown grew up in New Brunswick, New Jersey and attended New Brunswick High School. He enrolled at Seton Hall University, where he played college baseball for the Seton Hall Pirateswith future Major Leaguers Mo Vaughn, Craig Biggio, John Valentin, and Kevin Morton. The Philadelphia Phillies selected Brown in the 35th round of the 1989 Major League Baseball draft, and he played Minor League Baseball in the Phillies organization for three seasons.

After his playing career, Brown continued as a Minor League coach with the Phillies before becoming a scout for the Pittsburgh Pirates in 1994. He was promoted to East Coast Crosschecker with the Pirates before becoming the Director of Amateur scouting for the Montreal Expos in 2002. He remained with the franchise when they relocated, becoming the Washington Nationals. After the 2009 season, Alex Anthopoulos, the general manager of the Toronto Blue Jays and former assistant of Brown's with the Expos, hired Brown as a Special Assistant to the General Manager. Brown served as the vice president of scouting for the Atlanta Braves from 2019 to 2022. The Astros hired him as their General Manager on January 26, 2023.

References

External links

1967 births
Living people
Baseball players from New Jersey
Sportspeople from New Brunswick, New Jersey
New Brunswick High School alumni
Seton Hall Pirates baseball players
Pittsburgh Pirates scouts
Montreal Expos executives
Washington Nationals executives
Toronto Blue Jays executives
Atlanta Braves executives
Houston Astros executives
Major League Baseball general managers
Batavia Clippers players
Spartanburg Phillies players
Clearwater Phillies players
Reading Phillies players
African-American baseball players
African-American sports executives and administrators